Karl or Carl Larsson may refer to:

Karl Larsson (artist) (1893–1967), Swedish-American artist
Karl Larsson (sport shooter) (1865–1943), Swedish sports shooter
Karl August Larsson (1906–1971), Swedish sports shooter
Karl Larson, a character in the 2000 film Supernova
Carl Larsson (1853–1919), Swedish painter and interior designer

See also
Karl Larsen (disambiguation)
Carl Larson (disambiguation)
Carl Larsen (disambiguation)